"Autopsy Room Four" is a short story by American writer Stephen King. It was first published in King's limited-edition collection Six Stories in 1997 and appeared in the anthology Robert Bloch's Psychos later the same year. In 2002, it was collected in King's collection Everything's Eventual. It was adapted into a short film in 2003. It was also part of TNT's Nightmares & Dreamscapes: From the Stories of Stephen King series in the summer of 2006.

Sources
The plot is based on the set-up of the short story "Breakdown" by Louis Pollock, originally published in Collier's Magazine in 1947, in which the protagonist is paralyzed in an auto accident, and must prove that he is alive.  At one point in King's story, the protagonist explicitly thinks about a television adaptation of "Breakdown" which aired on Alfred Hitchcock Presents in 1955.

Plot

Howard Cottrell awakes from some form of unconsciousness to find himself laid out in an autopsy room. As the doctors prepare to begin, Howard struggles to come to grips with what is happening.

After realizing that he isn't dead, Howard deduces that he is in a paralysed state. Howard tries to somehow inform the doctors of this fact before they cut into him.

While prepping Cottrell's body, the doctor in charge, Katie Arlen, finds shrapnel wounds around his nether regions. While she is absent-mindedly examining these, another doctor rushes into the room to inform them that Howard is still alive. Katie looks down – to find herself holding Howard's erect penis.

In a humorous afternote, Howard explains that he was possibly bitten by a very rare snake, causing the deathlike paralysis. Another one of the doctors discovered that same snake in his golf bag and was promptly bitten. It's presumed that he will recover. Howard adds that he and Katie dated for a while, but parted due to an embarrassing issue in the boudoir (he was impotent unless she was wearing rubber gloves).

See also
 Stephen King short fiction bibliography

Notes 

 Supposedly Howard was bitten by a snake called a Peruvian Boomslang. There are no boomslangs in the Americas; the species is native to South Africa and the word means "tree snake" in Afrikaans. In his notes at the end, King says he got the name from Agatha Christie: the snake was featured in one of her Miss Marple books. King said that boomslang was just a word he liked, and that he "doubt[ed] like Hell" that a Peruvian one existed.
 A character named Howard Cottrell makes a brief appearance in The Shining, another novel by King, wherein he lends Dick Hallorann a pair of mittens as he makes his way to The Overlook Hotel. It is explained that Cottrell has a small amount of "shine"; the supernatural ability that allows Danny Torrance and Dick Halloran to read peoples thoughts, among other things. It is not clear if this character is the same person as the character in Autopsy Room Four.

Film, TV or theatrical adaptations 
 The short story was adapted as an hour-long episode of the Turner Network Television mini-series Nightmares and Dreamscapes in 2006, along with "The Road Virus Heads North".
 The music video of Incubus's song "Anna Molly" has a similar plot line.

Background
King writes: "At some point I think every writer of scary stories has to tackle the subject of premature burial, if only because it seems to be such a pervasive fear."

References

External links

Stephen King Short Movies – Autopsy Room Four Trailer

1997 short stories
Short stories by Stephen King